Tahitian Women on the Beach is an 1891 painting by Paul Gauguin. The painting depicts two women on the Pacific island of Tahiti on the beach.

The painting is currently in the collection of the Musée d'Orsay, located in Paris, France.

In 1892 Gauguin painted a similar painting Parau api, (Two Women of Tahiti) which is in the collection of the Galerie Neue Meister in Dresden. In Tahitian, "parau" means word and "api" means new. Thus "parau api" means news. A common greeting is "Eaha te parau api", or what's new?

References

1891 paintings
Tahitian art
Paintings by Paul Gauguin
Paintings in the collection of the Musée d'Orsay
Water in art